Rugby Union South Australia (RUSA) is the governing body for the sport of rugby union in the state of South Australia. It is a member of Rugby Australia and runs an amateur club competition in Adelaide consisting of men's teams in Premier grade, Premier reserves, Division 2 and Division 2 reserves; and junior teams grouped by age from under 7 to under 18. As of 2013, a women's competition has been included. The RUSA also selects representative teams each year to compete against other Australian states and territories.

History
The SA Rugby Union was established in 1932 after journalist Ian Sabey, from The Advertiser, convened a public meeting. This meeting resulted in the formation of the Adelaide Rugby Club, with enough players to field two 7-a-side teams. Interest in the sport grew, and by the end of that year, the Royal Australian Navy, Adelaide University and the Waratahs were ready to field teams in a local competition.

Rugby in the Adelaide area grew quickly and within a year, South Australia had fielded a team against Victoria for its first interstate match.

Rugby League benefited in the 1940s, when the Port Adelaide Rugby Union team fractured and changed codes. Over the following two decades, rugby grew across the metropolitan region and by the 1950s, South Australia boasted eight clubs. In 1951, with the competition and therefore financial risks growing, it was decided that it was in the Union's best interest to become an incorporated body. In the 1950s, 1960s, and early 1970s, the South Australian representative team competed in the Southern States Carnivals against Western Australia, Victoria and Tasmania. The SARU financed its own tour of Queensland and ACT in 1971, playing in Canberra, Toowoomba, and Brisbane.

By 1971 clubs included: Army, Adelaide University, Glenelg, Burnside, Elizabeth, Flinders University, North Adelaide, Old Collegians, Onkaparinga, Port Adelaide, Roseworthy College Rams, Salisbury, Southern Suburbs, West Torrens and Woodville.

Clubs which have fielded rugby teams in the past are: Aquinas, Black Forest, Central Districts, Flinders University, Gawler, Murray Bridge, North-West Districts, Salisbury, Smithfield Plains, Edinburgh, Lincoln, Pulteney Grammar School, Salisbury High School, Salisbury Com. Schools, Salisbury Teachers College, S.C.A.E., South Australian Institute of Technology, St Peters College, St Marks College, Tea Tree Gully, Kingswood, Adelaide, Royal Australian Naval Reserve, Whyalla, Waratahs, North Adelaide Baptist, Prince Alfred Old Collegians, Army, East Torrens, RAAF, SA Railways Institute and RAN. In 1978 Glenelg was renamed Brighton, the club's second name change, having previously been known as Kingston. In 2006 the Roseworthy college Rams were renamed Barossa Rams. Burnside fielded no junior teams until they amalgamated with The Waratahs Junior Rugby Union Football Club in 1992. North Torrens was formed when West Torrens and North Adelaide merged. Western Districts Junior Rugby Union Football Club (the Vikings) is the junior team for the two senior clubs of Woodville and Port Adelaide.

In 1995, Adelaide University and Old Collegians RFC established women's teams. Initially playing infrequently while building player numbers. By 2013 sufficient clubs had established women's teams for the Union to establish a formal competition.

In 1999, SA Rugby again took on corporate change and release its Incorporated Association status and become a Company Limited by Guarantee, further underlining its commercial strength. In 2006, SA Rugby Union Ltd merged with the SA Junior Rugby Union.

In 2014 Old Collegians broke an 8-year drought to win the premier grade premiership

Current clubs
As of 2018, there are fourteen clubs which make up RUSA, eleven of these clubs field senior men's sides, eight field senior women's sides and 11 field junior sides. There is also a golden oldies club for players 35+, and a rugby sevens club for women and girls (12+).

Premiership winners

Coopers Premier Grade

2019- Burnside
2018- Brighton
2017- Brighton 
 2016- Old Collegians Rugby Club
 2015- Onkaparinga
 2014- Old Collegians Rugby Club
 2013- Brighton
 2012- Brighton
 2011- Brighton
 2010- Brighton
 2009- Brighton
 2008- Brighton
 2007- Southern Suburbs
 2006- Old Collegians Rugby Club
 2005- Brighton
 2004- Brighton
 2003- Southern Suburbs
 2002- Port Adelaide
 2001- Old Collegians Rugby Club
 2000- Brighton

Division One

 2018 - Port Adelaide
 2017 - Elizabeth

Premier Reserve Grade

 2018 - Onkaparinga
 2017 - Burnside
 2016 - Barossa Rams
 2015 - Burnside
 2014- Old Collegians Rugby Club
 2013- Old Collegians Rugby Club
 2012- Old Collegians Rugby Club
 2011- Burnside

Representative teams

The Black Falcons team is selected from senior players within South Australia each year, and competes against other amateur representative rugby teams from states including Victoria and Western Australia. Junior Falcons teams are also chosen to play in national age group competitions. The Southern Warriors is the women's seven-a-side team that competes in tournaments including the National Women's Sevens tournament.

The South Australian Under 20 team competes in the Southern States Championship and also plays occasional matches against other representative sides. Prior to 2008, state colts teams at under 21 and under 19 age levels were fielded in national competitions.

From 2018 Black Falcons compete into Emerging States Championship and in 2019 also a second developing team, South Australia Under 23.

List of Australian club rugby union competitions

References

External links
South Australian Rugby Official Website
Barossa Rams Rugby Club
Port Adelaide Rugby Club
Old Collegians Rugby Club

Rugby union in South Australia
Australian rugby union governing bodies
Rug
1932 establishments in Australia
Sports organizations established in 1932